Koziniec  is a village (former city) in the administrative district of Gmina Ząbkowice Śląskie, within Ząbkowice Śląskie County, Lower Silesian Voivodeship, in south-western Poland.

References

Koziniec
Former populated places in Lower Silesian Voivodeship